The Oloy Range is a mountain range in the Chukotka Autonomous Okrug, Far Eastern Federal District, Russia. 

The range is composed of sandstones, siltstones and andesitic tuffs with granodiorite intrusions.

History
The Oloy Range was first mapped in the summer of 1870 by topographer P. Afonasiev who was part of the 1868 - 1870 East Siberia expedition of Baron Gerhard von Maydell (1835–1894) and astronomer Karl Karlovich Neyman (1830s–1887).

Geography
The Oloy Range rises in the northernmost sector of the Kolyma Highlands System. The Omolon River marks its western limit, the Oloy river, a right tributary of the Omolon, limits it to the south. The Oloychan valley forms the northern boundary, while the eastern limit is not clearly delimited.

Many rivers originate in the Oloy Range, including tributaries of the Omolon, such as the Oloychan, of the Bolshoy Anyuy, such as the Pezhenka (Пеженка), as well as of the Anadyr, such as the Yablon and the Yeropol which have their sources in the eastern area of range.

Flora
The slopes of the Oloy Mountains are largely bare and have a barren look, the only vegetation cover being mountain tundra. In certain locations there are thickets of dwarf Siberian pine. There is larch undergrowth along the valleys.

See also
List of mountains and hills of Russia

References

External links
Kolyma - Tourism
Mountain ranges of Chukotka Autonomous Okrug
Kolyma Mountains